"Southtown U.S.A." is a song released by The Dixiebelles in late 1963. The song spent eight weeks on the Billboard Hot 100 chart, reaching No. 15, while reaching No. 20 on the Cash Box Top 100, and No. 18 on Canada's CHUM Hit Parade.

Chart performance

Cover versions
In 1964, Lawrence Welk and His Orchestra released a version of the song on the album Early Hits of 1964. The song was released as a single in 1970, and reached No. 37 on Billboards Easy Listening chart.

References

1963 songs
1963 singles
Songs written by Billy Sherrill